The 5th constituency of Essonne is a French legislative constituency in the Essonne département.

Description

The 5th constituency of Essonne covers the north west corner of the department and includes the suburbs of Les Ulis and Orsay both of which lie on the southern edge of the Paris urban area. The seat was created in 1986 as the number of seats in Essonne grew from four to ten reflecting the rapidly increasing population and urbanisation of the department.
The largest town in the constituency Les Ulis is a new town constructed in the 1970s and is home to a large population of African and Arab origin.

Historic Representation

Election results

2022

 
 
 
 
 
 
|-
| colspan="8" bgcolor="#E9E9E9"|
|-

2017

 
 
 
 
 
 
 
|-
| colspan="8" bgcolor="#E9E9E9"|
|-

2012

 
 
 
 
 
 
 
|-
| colspan="8" bgcolor="#E9E9E9"|
|-

2007

 
 
 
 
 
 
 
|-
| colspan="8" bgcolor="#E9E9E9"|
|-

2002

 
 
 
 
|-
| colspan="8" bgcolor="#E9E9E9"|
|-

1997

 
 
 
 
 
 
 
 
 
|-
| colspan="8" bgcolor="#E9E9E9"|
|-

Sources

Official results of French elections from 2002: "Résultats électoraux officiels en France" (in French).

5